Jonathan Josué Cisternas Fernández (born 16 June 1980) is a Chilean football manager and former footballer who played as midfielder.

His nickname is Jinete.

Club career
He started in Deportes Concepción, which was where he stepped up to play for the Copa Libertadores in 2001, his career ended when his team were acquired in 2003 by Cobreloa, his career was even more successful because he won a double in 2003, and a Clausura tournament in 2004 and 2006.

He, unfortunately had a bad relationship with his coach, Jorge Aravena when he wanted to go to Universidad de Chile, where he could reach his full potential, so he then went to Coquimbo Unido, and after that continued his career in Ñublense where he became a keen player, took the club to its first international tournament which was Copa Sudamericana and was chosen to be one of the greatest midfielders of the Chilean league in 2008–2009, and by the end of 2010 he became the captain of the club.

Managerial career
In 2018, he joined the technical staff of Pablo Guede in Colo-Colo as an assistant coach, turning after to fitness coach. After he was with Guede in Al Ahli, Morelia and Tijuana. In 2022, he joined the technical staff of Nelson Tapia in the Ecuadorian club Libertad FC.

Honours

Club
Cobreloa
 Primera División de Chile (3): 2003 Apertura, 2003 Clausura, 2004 Clausura

References

External links

Jonathan Cisternas at playmakerstats.com (English version of ceroacero.es)

1980 births
Living people
Footballers from Santiago
Chilean footballers
Chile international footballers
Deportes Concepción (Chile) footballers
Cobreloa footballers
Universidad de Chile footballers
Coquimbo Unido footballers
Ñublense footballers
Club Deportivo Palestino footballers
Chilean Primera División players
Primera B de Chile players
Association football midfielders
Chilean football managers
Chilean expatriate football managers
Expatriate football managers in Saudi Arabia
Chilean expatriate sportspeople in Saudi Arabia
Expatriate football managers in Mexico
Chilean expatriate sportspeople in Mexico
Expatriate football managers in Ecuador
Chilean expatriate sportspeople in Ecuador